Ewelina Ptak (born 20 March 1987) is a Polish track and field sprint athlete.

Klocek represented Poland at the 2008 Summer Olympics in Beijing. She competed at the 4x100 metres relay together with Daria Korczyńska, Dorota Jedrusinska and Marta Jeschke. In their first round heat they placed fifth behind Belgium, Great Britain, Brazil and Nigeria. Their time of 43.47 seconds was the second best non-directly qualifying time and the seventh time overall out of sixteen participating nations. With this result they qualified for the final in which they replaced Jeschke with Joanna Henryka Kocielnik. In the final they were eventually disqualified.

Competition record

References

External links
 
 

1987 births
Living people
Polish female sprinters
Olympic athletes of Poland
Athletes (track and field) at the 2008 Summer Olympics
Athletes (track and field) at the 2012 Summer Olympics
People from Trzebnica
European Athletics Championships medalists
Sportspeople from Lower Silesian Voivodeship
Universiade medalists in athletics (track and field)
Śląsk Wrocław athletes
Universiade silver medalists for Poland
Universiade bronze medalists for Poland
World Athletics Indoor Championships medalists
Medalists at the 2009 Summer Universiade
Medalists at the 2013 Summer Universiade
Olympic female sprinters